Selwyn Aldridge Jones (born May 13, 1970) is a former cornerback who played six seasons in the National Football League.

At the time of his entering the NFL draft, Jones had set the career record for interceptions with 15 at Colorado State University. He finished the 1990 season with 6 interceptions. Jones was invited to play in the Senior Bowl and the East West Shrine game but couldn't attend due to a hip injury. Jones was the #5 rated NFL cornerback prospect heading into his senior year at Colorado State by USA Today in 1991. Jones was drafted by the Cleveland Browns in April 1992 and placed on injured reserve. Jones returned to action for the 1993 season under Bill Belichick and Nick Saban with 24 tackles and 3 interceptions for the Cleveland Browns. Jones intercepted David Klingler of the Cincinnati Bengals twice in a September 5, 1993, nationally televised game. Jones hauled in another interception against Steve Young and the 49ers the very next week in a Monday night match-up. The 1994 season saw Jones get released mid-year from the Cleveland Browns and join the  New Orleans Saints in late October 1994. Jones made 2 starts and played in 7 games for the Saints. As a free agent, Jones signed a 2 year $1.9 million deal with the Seattle Seahawks in 1995. He played in 12 games that season. Jones completed the 1996 season with one interception and 24 tackles. Jones signed with the Denver Broncos in May 1997 and won the starting right cornerback spot prior to sustaining a left knee injury early in the season and was placed on season-ending injured reserve. In Super Bowl XXXII, the Broncos defeated the Green Bay Packers thus earning the city of Denver and Selwyn Jones their first Super Bowl ring in February 1998.

Personal life

Jones' parents are Alvin and Shirley Jones. He has two brothers, named Alvin Jr. and Avery. Jones is married to Raquel Ramirez. Raquel is the Founder of the non-profit organization "Daughter's Gather At The Table" and a prominent Fashion Influencer. The couple's daughter, Anastaja, started as a true freshman for the North Carolina Central University volleyball team. Anastaja graduated from the University of Houston in summer 2019. Jones and his family reside in the Houston area where he is a Purchasing Manager for a Fortune 500 company. Also, Selwyn and Raquel own several acres of land in Centerville,TX and a condo in Northern Colorado. Selwyn is not the only member of the Jones' family to achieve stardom. His younger brother (Avery) earned six figures as a music producer and now owns several mobile barbershops that have taken over the Houston area. With over 200 active clients, "Stop N Style" mobile barbershops have been in business since 2014.

References

1970 births
American football cornerbacks
Cleveland Browns players
Colorado State Rams football players
New Orleans Saints players
Seattle Seahawks players
Denver Broncos players
Sportspeople from Texas
People from Houston
Living people